General Wadsworth may refer to:

James Wadsworth (lawyer) (1730–1816), Connecticut Militia brigadier general in the American Revolutionary War
James S. Wadsworth (1807–1864), Union Army brevet major general
Peleg Wadsworth (1748–1829), Continental Army brigadier general
William Wadsworth (officer) (1765–1833), New York State Militia brigadier general